Tim Myers is an American author who publishes under a number of pen names, including Jessica Beck. As Beck, he is the author of the Donut Shop Mystery, Classic Diner Mystery, Ghost Cat Cozy Mystery, and Cast Iron Cooking Mystery series. The author has been nominated for the Agatha Award and named an Independent Mystery Booksellers Association national bestseller. Beck is most known for the Donut Shop Mystery series, which features main protagonist Suzanne Hart, who runs a Donut Hearts shop in the town of April Springs in North Carolina.

Bibliography

Lighthouse Inn Mysteries series
 Innkeeping with Murder, Berkley, June 2001 
 Reservations for Murder, Berkley, June 2002 
 Murder Checks Inn, Berkley, December 2002 
 Room for Murder, Berkley, September 2003 
 Booked for Murder, Berkley, August 2004 
 Key to Murder, Self Published, August 2011 
 Ring for Murder, Self Published, August 2011 
 Honeymoon for Murder, Self Published, May 2017

Candlemaking Mysteries series
 At Wick's End, Berkley, January 2004 
 Snuffed Out, Berkley, November 2004 
 Death Waxed Over, Berkley, October 2005 
 A Flicker of Doubt, Berkley, January 2006 
 Waxing Moon: A Short Story, Self Published, March 2011 (e-book)

Soapmaking Mysteries series
 Dead Men Don't Lye, Berkley, February 2006 
 A Pour Way to Dye, Berkley, August 2006 
 A Mold for Murder, Berkley, April 2007

Gentle Southern Mysteries series
 Coventry, Self Published, August 2011 
 A Family of Strangers, Self Published, April 2011 
 Volunteer for Murder, Self Published, August 2011

Paranormal Kids series
 Paranormal Kids, Self Published, April 2011 
 Paranormal Camp, Self Published, April 2011

Wizard's School series
 Year One: The Wizard's Secret, Self Published, August 2011 
 Year Two: The Killing Crystal, Self Published, May 2012

Books of Time series
 The Book of Time and Ben Franklin, Self Published, January 2011 (e-book)
 The Book of Time and Thomas Edison, Self Published, January 2011 (e-book)
 The Book of Time and Archimedes, Self Published, January 2011 (e-book)

Lost in Art series
 Lost in Monet's Garden, Self Published, January 2011 (e-book)
 Lost in Picasso's Cubes, Self Published, January 2011 (e-book)

Slow Cooker Mysteries series
 Slow Cooked Murder, Self Published, December 2011 
 Simmering Death, Self Published, December 2011

Pizza series
 Rest in Pizza (Pizza Lover's Mystery Book 4) (RestInPizza.de), Published by Join Now, April 2011

Stand Alone
 Crispin Livingston Hughes, Boy Inventor, Self Published, July 2010 (e-book)
 Emma's Emerald Mine, Self Published, July 2010 (e-book)
 The Fairy Godfather: A Modern Romantic Fairy Tale, Self Published, July 2010 
 Lightning Ridge, Self Published, August 2011 
 Rebuilding My Life, Self Published, August 2011 
 Tackling the Truth, Self Published, August 2011 
 The Amazing Voltini, Self Published, August 2011

Collections
 Long Shots, Self Published, March 2011 (e-book)
 Can You Guess What's Next? Volume One, Self Published, July 2011 (e-book)
 Can You Guess What's Next? Volume Two, Self Published, July 2011 (e-book)
 Did You Solve the Crime? Volume One, Self Published, July 2011 (e-book)
 Did You Solve the Crime? Volume Two, Self Published, July 2011 (e-book)
 Did You Solve the Crime? Volume Three, Self Published, July 2011 (e-book)
 Repeat Performances, Self Published, July 2011 (e-book)
 Beauty Time 3, Self Published, November 2011 (e-book)
 Senior Sleuths, Self Published, November 2011 (e-book)
 Crimes with a Twist, Self Published, July 2014 (e-book)
 Dark Sips of Mystery, Self Published, July 2014 (e-book)
 Hidden Messages, Self Published, July 2014 (e-book)
 Marriage Can Be Murder, Self Published, July 2014 (e-book)
 Money Mysteries, Self Published, July 2014 (e-book)
 Murder is a Special Occasion, Self Published, July 2014 (e-book)
 Murder Nine to Five, Self Published, July 2014 (e-book)
 Pet Mysteries, Self Published, July 2014 (e-book)
 Senior Sleuths Again, Self Published, July 2014 (e-book)
 Turning the Tables, Self Published, July 2014 (e-book)
 Minecraft, RestInPizza Network, September 2016 (full release)

Pseudonyms

Chris Cavender (Voldechse)
Jessica Beck
Elizabeth Bright
Melissa Glazer
Casey Mayes
Ingrid Meier
D. B. Morgan
T. S. Punkt (Freezle)
S. Y. Paulson (undefined)

References

External links

21st-century American novelists
American mystery writers
Year of birth missing (living people)
Living people
21st-century pseudonymous writers